Lucas Lessio (born January 23, 1993) is a Canadian professional ice hockey player. He is currently under contract with EC KAC of the ICE Hockey League (ICEHL). Lessio was selected 56th overall by the Phoenix Coyotes in the 2011 NHL Entry Draft.

Playing career
Lessio played his final season of major junior hockey with the 2012–13 Oshawa Generals, scoring 19 goals and 34 points in 35 Ontario Hockey League games. He also appeared in five American Hockey League games with the Portland Pirates near the end of the 2012–13 AHL season, where he registered a goal and an assist.

Following a successful pre-season training camp, Lessio made the cut to start the 2013–14 season in the NHL with the Phoenix Coyotes.

In the 2015–16 season, Lessio was assigned to begin the year with new AHL affiliate, the Springfield Falcons. On December 15, 2015, Lessio was traded to the Montreal Canadiens in exchange for Christian Thomas. He remained in the AHL, assigned to the Canadiens' affiliate, the St. John's IceCaps. On January 31, 2016, he was called up from St. John's to the Montreal Canadiens.

In October 2016, Lessio opted to take his game overseas, accepting an offer from Medvescak Zagreb of the Kontinental Hockey League (KHL). He saw action in 38 KHL contests, tallying eleven goals and nine assists. In February 2017, he transferred to Örebro HK of the Swedish Hockey League. Lessio played out the season with Örebro, registering 2 goals in 8 games to end his brief tenure with the club.

On June 20, 2017, Lessio returned for a second stint in the KHL, agreeing to a one-year deal with Latvian based club, Dinamo Riga. In the 2017–18 season, Lessio appeared in just 13 games with Riga before he was released and later signed with Kunlun Red Star on November 3, 2017.

On July 22, 2020, Lessio signed with the Krefeld Pinguine of the DEL.

Career statistics

Regular season and playoffs

International

Awards and Achievements

References

External links

1993 births
Living people
Arizona Coyotes draft picks
Arizona Coyotes players
Canadian ice hockey left wingers
Dinamo Riga players
HIFK (ice hockey) players
EC KAC players
KHL Medveščak Zagreb players
Krefeld Pinguine players
HC Kunlun Red Star players
Montreal Canadiens players
Stadion Hradec Králové players
Örebro HK players
Oshawa Generals players
Phoenix Coyotes players
Portland Pirates players
St. John's IceCaps players
Springfield Falcons players
Canadian expatriate ice hockey players in the Czech Republic
Canadian expatriate ice hockey players in Croatia
Canadian expatriate ice hockey players in China
Canadian expatriate ice hockey players in Latvia
Canadian expatriate ice hockey players in Finland
Canadian expatriate ice hockey players in Sweden
Ice hockey people from Ontario
Canadian expatriate ice hockey players in the United States
Canadian expatriate ice hockey players in Germany
Canadian expatriate ice hockey players in Austria